The Society of Multivariate Experimental Psychology (SMEP) is a small academic organization of research psychologists who have interests in multivariate statistical models for advancing psychological knowledge. It publishes a journal, Multivariate Behavioral Research.

History
SMEP was founded in 1960 by Raymond Cattell and others as an organization of scientific researchers interested in applying complex multivariate quantitative methods to substantive problems in psychology. The two main functions of the society are to hold an annual meeting of scientific or quantitative psychology specialists and to publish a journal, Multivariate Behavioral Research. The first meeting of the Society was held in Chicago in the fall of 1961. Beginning in 1993, the meeting has been held annually.

Membership
The new members of SMEP are elected by existing members, and membership is considered to be honorific. To promote interaction among participants in the annual meeting, the membership is limited to 65 active members under the age of 65, as well as to emeritus members (active members aged 65 and older who attend the annual meeting regularly).  The Bylaws of SMEP stipulate that there should be twice the number of nominees for membership as available slots.

Presidents 
The president of SMEP is elected by the membership and the list of former presidents is below.

 2021: Niels Waller
 2020: David P. MacKinnon
 2019: Peter Molenaar
 2018: Debbi Bandalos
 2017: David Kaplan
 2016: Ken Bollen
 2015: Alan Nicewander 
 2014: William Shadish
 2013: Steven M. Boker
 2012: Scott M. Hofer
 2011: Scott E. Maxwell
 2010: Lisa L. Harlow
 2009: Patrick E. Shrout
 2008: Wayne F. Velicer
 2007: Stephen G. West
 2006: Leona S. Aiken
 2005: James H. Steiger
 2004: Joseph Lee Rodgers
 2003: David Rindskopf
 2002: Roderick McDonald
 2001: Roger Millsap
 2000: Robert C. MacCallum
 1999: John R. Nesselroade
 1998: Michael W. Browne
 1997: Susan Embretson
 1996: Keith F. Widaman
 1995: Linda M. Collins
 1994: Robert Cudeck
 1993: Patricia R. Cohen
 1992: John J. McArdle
 1991: Stanley A. Mulaik
 1990: Herbert W. Eber
 1989: John C. Loehlin
 1988: William M. Meredith
 1987: Andrew L. Comrey
 1986: A. Ralph Hakstian
 1985: Henry F. Kaiser
 1984: William Revelle
 1983: Norman Cliff
 1982: J. Douglas Carroll
 1981: Jack Block
 1980: Jerry Wiggins
 1979: Peter M. Bentler
 1978: John M. Digman
 1977: Goldine C. Gleser
 1976: John L. Horn
 1975: Douglas N. Jackson
 1974: Lewis R. Goldberg
 1973: Harry H. Harman
 1972: Desmond S. Cartwright
 1971: Warren T. Norman
 1970: Maurice Lorr
 1969: Jacob Cohen
 1968: Donald W. Fiske
 1967: Robert C. Tryon, succeeded by Merrill Roff
 1966: Chester W. Harris
 1965: Benjamin Fruchter
 1964: John W. French
 1963: Charles F. Wrigley
 1962: Saul B. Sells
 1961: Raymond B. Cattell
 1960: Raymond B. Cattell

Annual meeting
The annual meeting spans two and one half days and consists exclusively of presentations by members in a single session.  The program is arranged to allow ample discussion of each presentation. Since 2003, a half-day graduate student pre-conference has been held in conjunction with the annual meeting. PhD students sponsored by SMEP members present their research to those attending the annual meeting. The meeting also elects a new president.

In addition, the Society grants multiple annual awards. The Sells Award, named after Saul Sells, is given for distinguished multivariate research to an individual that has made a lifetime-level achievement in the field of multivariate psychology research.  The Tanaka Award, named for Jeffrey Tanaka, is given for the best article in Multivariate Behavioral Research that year. The SMEP Early Career Research Award is given to a young researcher that the Society believes shows promise of high quality work throughout their coming future career. The final annual award is the Barbara Byrne Award, named for Barbara M. Byrne and granted for an outstanding book or edited volume within the field of multivariate analysis. The Society also has the Eber Award, which is not an annual award, but it is granted at the annual meeting after nomination and voting by the Trustees to reward outstanding service to the Society.

Journal
The SMEP journal, Multivariate Behavioral Research (MBR), publishes research articles on multivariate methodology and its use in psychological research. The 2021 Editor of MBR is Jeffrey Harring, and the journal is published by Taylor & Francis Group.

SMEP and Taylor & Francis also cooperate in the publication of a series of books on applications of multivariate quantitative methods to important substantive research issues. The book series is edited by Lisa Harlow.

The Society uses revenue from the journal to fund programs that promote learning of statistical methods in psychology and education, with a special emphasis on increasing the number of persons from under-represented groups in quantitative psychology.

References

External links
 The Society of Multivariate Experimental Psychology
 Current Issue of Multivariate Behavioral Research

Psychology organizations based in the United States
Statistical societies
Organizations established in 1960